Stachys stebbinsii is a species of perennial herb in the mint family commonly known as Stebbins' hedgenettle. This plant is characterized by a musky aroma, flowers with large lower lips, and glandular hairs that densely cover the stems. S. stebbinsii is native to California and northwestern Baja California. It is usually found growing in moist places in a wide variety of habitats including disturbed areas, chaparral, coastal sage scrub and mountains.

Description 
Stachys stebbinsii is a rhizomatous perennial herb. The leaves, upper stems, and calyx are abundantly covered in dense, yellowish, sticky, mostly glandular hairs that emit a strong musky odor. The size of the lower lip on the corolla, the strong odor, the cordate leaves, and the dense glandular hairs on the stem distinguish this species from Stachys rigida and Stachys ajugoides.

The leaf base is shaped truncate to strongly cordate, and the leaf margins have a prominent scalloped edge.

The inflorescences are 6-flowered clusters.

Taxonomy 
Stachys stebbinsii was described by Gerald A. Mulligan and Derek B. Munro in their 1989 treatment on the Stachys species of North America. Before it was described, S. stebbinsii was usually included under Stachys rigida or Stachys ajugoides var. rigida. The chromosome number is 2n = 66.

Stachys stebbinsii is named after G. Ledyard Stebbins.

Distribution and habitat

Distribution 
Stachys stebbinsii is native to western California and Baja California. In California, it is found from the San Francisco area south to San Diego County. Localities mentioned in the type description include Lake Merced, areas in Napa County, Berry Canyon in Butte County, San Luis Obispo, the Santa Ana River, the Santa Ana Mountains in Orange County, the San Jacinto Mountains and Elsinore in Riverside County, and San Diego County. In Baja California, it is rarely found from Tijuana south to El Rosario, but is most abundant in the Sierra de San Pedro Martir.

Habitat 
Stachys stebbinsii is usually found in moist or wet environments in a variety of habitats. This includes areas along water courses, near wetlands and waterbodies, and roadside ditches. In Baja California, habitats include coastal sage scrub, chaparral, and the various environments of the California Floristic Province part of the Peninsular Ranges. Substrates S. stebbinsii is usually associated with include humus and seepage soils, but also sand, gravel, or other substrates across its range where moisture is plentiful.

Gallery

References

External links 

 Landscape info at Calscape
 Stachys stebbinsii at Lady Bird Johnson Wildflower Center
 Stachys stebbinsii — UC Photo Gallery

stebbinsii
Flora of California
Flora of Baja California
Natural history of the Peninsular Ranges
Natural history of the California chaparral and woodlands
Natural history of the California Coast Ranges
Plants described in 1989